Gaël Monfils was the defending champion, but was no longer eligible to compete in the juniors this year.

Jérémy Chardy defeated Robin Haase in the final, 6–4, 6–3 to win the boys' singles tennis title at the 2005 Wimbledon Championships.

Seeds

 n/a
  Donald Young (semifinals)
  Leonardo Mayer (third round)
  Kim Sun-yong (second round)
  Marin Čilić (quarterfinals)
  Niels Desein (third round)
  Sergei Bubka (first round)
  Petar Jelenić (first round)
  Carsten Ball (first round)
  Sam Querrey (third round)
  André Miele (first round)
  Raony Carvalho (first round)
  Andreas Haider-Maurer (first round)
  Robin Haase (final)
  Timothy Neilly (quarterfinals)
  David Navarrete (second round)
  Thiemo de Bakker (third round)

Draw

Finals

Top half

Section 1

Section 2

Bottom half

Section 3

Section 4

References

External links

Boys' Singles
Wimbledon Championship by year – Boys' singles